Nigeria is a very ethnically diverse country with 371 ethnic groups, the largest of which are the Yoruba, Hausa and the Igbo. These ethnic groups consist of multiple tribes enumerating up to 371. Nevertheless, the multi-tribal nature of the nation may put someone at a loss, especially when these certain tribes start to display their unique culture, dialect, etc. To this end, a full list of the 371 tribes in Nigeria is provided for a better understanding  and comprehension of the beautiful and united country called Nigeria.  Nigeria has one official language which is English, as a result of the British colonial rule over the nation. Nevertheless, it is not spoken as a first language in the entire country due to the fact that other languages have been around for over a thousand years making them the major languages in terms of number of native speakers. Over 500 languages are spoken among its about 230 million people. This is a result of the number of existing ethnic groups, some of the popular languages spoken in Nigeria are listed as follows; as Igbo, Yoruba, Hausa, Kanuri, Ijaw, Ibibio, Edo, Fulfude, Tiv etc.

List of ethnic groups 

The following is a non-exhaustive list of ethnic groups in Nigeria.

References 

Nigeria
Ethnic
 Nigeria